Mathilde Gros (born 24 October 1999) is a French racing cyclist. She rode in the women's sprint event at the 2018 UCI Track Cycling World Championships.

References

External links
 

1999 births
Living people
French female cyclists
French track cyclists
People from Lens, Pas-de-Calais
Cyclists at the 2019 European Games
European Games medalists in cycling
European Games silver medalists for France
Cyclists at the 2020 Summer Olympics
Olympic cyclists of France
Sportspeople from Pas-de-Calais
Cyclists from Hauts-de-France
21st-century French women
UCI Track Cycling World Champions (women)